Lima Christian School is a private Christian school located in Lima, New York. It serves grades kindergarten through 12.

The school was founded in 1974 by Lima Baptist Church Pastor Noah Stoltzfus.

External links

Christian schools in New York (state)
Education in Livingston County, New York
Schools in Livingston County, New York
Private high schools in New York (state)
Private middle schools in New York (state)
Private elementary schools in New York (state)